Bedfordshire South was a constituency of the European Parliament located in the United Kingdom, electing one Member of the European Parliament by the first-past-the-post electoral system. Created in 1984 from parts of Bedfordshire and Northamptonshire, it was abolished in 1994 and succeeded by Bedfordshire and Milton Keynes.

Boundaries
It consisted of the parliamentary constituencies of Luton South, Milton Keynes, North Hertfordshire, Luton North, South West Bedfordshire, Stevenage, and West Hertfordshire.

When it was abolished in 1994, the parliamentary constituencies of Luton South, Luton North, South West Bedfordshire and the new seats of Milton Keynes South West and North East Milton Keynes became part of the Bedfordshire and Milton Keynes constituency, while North Hertfordshire and West Hertfordshire were transferred to Hertfordshire, and Stevenage was transferred to Essex West and Hertfordshire East.

MEPs

Election results

References

External links
 David Boothroyd's United Kingdom Election Results 

European Parliament constituencies in England (1979–1999)
Politics of Bedfordshire
1984 establishments in England
1994 disestablishments in England
Constituencies established in 1984
Constituencies disestablished in 1994